Krummennaab is a municipality in the district of Tirschenreuth in Bavaria, Germany.

References

Tirschenreuth (district)